Body Language (stylized in all lowercase) is the twelfth studio album by American country music singer Blake Shelton. The album was released on May 21, 2021, by Warner Bros. Nashville and Ten Point Productions.

Commercial performance
Body Language debuted at number eighteen on the Billboard 200 with 24,000 units (15,000 pure). The same week, Shelton earned his 17th top 10 on Billboards Top Country Albums chart.

Track listing

Personnel
Musicians

 Blake Shelton – lead vocals
 Bryan Sutton – acoustic guitar (1, 2, 4, 6, 8, 10, 12), banjo (6, 10), ukulele (10)
 Gordon Mote – Hammond B3 organ (1, 3, 6, 10), piano (1, 4, 5, 8, 9, 11, 12), synthesizer (6, 10, 12)
 Kara Britz – backing vocals (1)
 Jimmie Lee Sloas – bass guitar (1–5, 7–9, 11)
 Nir Z. – programming (all tracks), drums (1–11), percussion (2–5, 7–9, 11, 12)
 Tom Bukovac – electric guitar (1–5, 7–9, 11)
 Troy Lancaster – electric guitar
 Russ Pahl – pedal steel guitar (1–5, 7–9, 11)
 Blake Bollinger – programming (1, 2, 4, 7, 8), synthesizer (1, 2, 4, 7–9)
 Justin Niebank – programming (1–5, 7–11)
 Nicholas "Blaze" Baum – acoustic guitar, electric guitar (2)
 Gwen Stefani – duet vocals (3)
 Zach Swon – acoustic guitar, backing vocals, electric guitar, keyboards (2)
 Colton Swon – backing vocals (2)
 Perry Coleman – backing vocals (2, 4–12)
 Ilya Toshinsky – acoustic guitar (3, 5, 7, 9, 11), banjo (3)
 Rob McNelley – electric guitar (5, 6, 8–12)
 Glenn Worf – bass guitar (6, 10, 12)
 Paul Franklin – Dobro (6), pedal steel guitar (10, 12)
 Jenee Fleenor – fiddle (6, 10)

Technical
 Scott Hendricks – producer, digital editor, additional engineer
 Andrew Mendelson – mastering engineer
 Justin Niebank – mixing engineer, audio engineer, recording engineer
 Scott Johnson – assistant production
 Brian David Willis – digital editor
 Drew Bollman – assistant engineer
 Josh Ditty – assistant engineer
 Charlie Marshall – assistant engineer (3)
 Kam Luchterhand – assistant engineer (3)
 Tate McDowell – assistant engineer (3)

Charts

Weekly charts

Year-end charts

References

2021 albums
Blake Shelton albums
Warner Records albums
Albums produced by Scott Hendricks